Molly Parker is a Canadian actress who began her career in 1991 appearing in television productions. After appearing in several films, including the teen comedy Just One of the Girls (1993), and the television film Serving in Silence (1995), Parker was cast as a necrophiliac medical student in the controversial drama film Kissed (1996). She subsequently portrayed Chyna Shepherd in the television thriller film Intensity (1997), and appeared in a supporting role in the historical drama film Sunshine (1999).

Parker made her first major American film, Waking the Dead, in 2000, and garnered mainstream recognition for her portrayal of Alma Garret on the HBO series Deadwood, from 2004 to 2006. Throughout the 2000s, Parker also appeared in numerous films, including the drama Nine Lives (2005), the horror film The Wicker Man (2006), and the thriller The Road (2009). Parker guest-starred on the series Dexter in 2011, and subsequently guest-starred in three seasons of the Netflix political thriller series House of Cards between 2014 and 2016. Parker starred in three additional Netflix projects in 2017: the crime film Small Crimes, the Stephen King film adaptation 1922, and Errol Morris's docudrama series Wormwood. Beginning 2018, she began starring as Maureen Robinson in Netflix's Lost in Space.

Film

Television

See also
 List of awards and nominations received by Molly Parker

References

Sources
 
 

Actress filmographies
Canadian filmographies